Chamaesphecia turbida is a moth of the family Sesiidae. It is found in eastern Turkey, Iran and the Caucasus.

The larvae feed on the roots of species in the genus Euphorbia.

References

Moths described in 1937
Sesiidae